Pucallpa cristata is a species of beetle in the family Cerambycidae. Lane described it in 1959.

References

Acanthocinini
Beetles described in 1959